Haïti Progrès is a US-based weekly newspaper founded in 1983 that focuses on news concerning Haiti. It is published in Brooklyn, New York, and has offices in Port-au-Prince. Its main edition is in French, but it also publishes in English and Haitian Creole.

Politics 
Editorially, Haïti Progrès follows a  generally progressive  perspective.

See also 
List of newspapers in New York
List of newspapers in Haiti

References

External links 
Haïti Progrès website

1983 establishments in New York (state)
French-language newspapers published in the United States
Haitian-American culture in New York City
Haitian Creole-language mass media
Newspapers published in Haiti
Newspapers published in Brooklyn
Publications established in 1983
African-American newspapers published in New York (state)